Mark Cross is an English hard rock and heavy metal drummer. He has played in many bands in his career and is currently based in Athens, Greece. Mark recorded in 1992 an album with Greek singer/songwriter Michalis Rakintzis named "Etsi Maresei".

Cross left Helloween in 2002. He had recorded two tracks with them, both of which featured on their Rabbit Don't Come Easy album in 2003.

His comeback was a low-key demo recording with The Supremacy, a project band also featuring Bill Hudson of Cellador and Fernando Giovannetti of Aquaria in 2004. In 2005 he featured as a session and touring musician for At Vance and also appeared on the British rock band Saracen's latest album, Vox in Excelso and Winter's Bane's comeback album, Redivivus.

With Firewind he released Allegiance in July 2006 and toured with them extensively throughout the world in 2006 and 2007, playing more than 150 shows. With their new album The Premonition, which was released in April 2008 he and Firewind toured Europe and North America with Swedish metallers Arch Enemy. On 13 January 2010, Cross announced that he and Firewind had split.

Cross has used Paiste cymbals, Tama drums, Vic Firth drumsticks, Evans drumheads and cymbals in the shape of Iron Crosses made by Factory Metal Percussion.

External links
Mark Cross' official website
Firewind's official website

Firewind members
Living people
Helloween members
Tank (band) members
Metalium members
Year of birth missing (living people)